Legislative Assembly elections will be held in Assam in month of March to April 2026 to elect 126 members of the Assam Legislative Assembly. The term of current assembly elected in 2021 will expire on May 2, 2026. Himanta Biswa Sharma currently plans to continue in his role as chief minister for the elections.

Background 
In the previous assembly elections, the incumbent BJP-led National Democratic Alliance (NDA) retaining power with 75 seats, which marks the first time a non-INC alliance winning consecutive terms in the state. The Mahajot led by INC won 50 seats, increasing its tally from 26 in 2016. After the victory, Himanta Biswa Sharma became the next chief minister of the state. After the election, All India United Democratic Front & Bodoland People's Front dropped out of the Mahajot coalition.

Schedule

Parties & Alliances





Others

Notes

References 

State Assembly elections in Assam
2020s in Assam